Don Marion Davis (October 9, 1917 – December 10, 2020), professionally known as John Henry Jr. and  Don Marion, was an American child actor of the silent film era, who during a brief career in show business appeared in several feature roles and comedy shorts in Hollywood screened between 1919 and 1925. He also had uncredited parts in radio. He was one of the last surviving actors who worked in the silent film era.

Biography

Entertainment career
He was born in Hollywood, California, on October 9, 1917, to Henry G. Davis and Helen Davis. He was discovered by studio entrepreneur and director Mack Sennett while he and his mother were visiting his uncle, British-born American actor and comedian  Billy Armstrong around 1919. He was visiting the set of a film when the baby who was originally cast was not performing well. Davis then replaced him successfully.

In a 1920 newspaper article, he was described as one of the most famous child actors in the world. His feature-length films included Down on the Farm (1920) and A Small Town Idol (1921). He was often cast alongside the dog Teddy, who was one of the most well-known film animals of the era. By 1921, his films reportedly had to adjust to the fact that he was continuously growing.

Post-entertainment career
After leaving the entertainment industry in 1925, he attended the University of Oregon and joined the U.S. Army in 1940, shortly prior to the United States entering World War II. He was stationed in Europe during this time as an infantry officer. After the war, he remained with the American military and held various positions in different countries, such as South Africa and South Korea. He graduated from University of Arizona with a degree in Master of Public Administration.

He resided in Tucson, Arizona. At the age of 99, he was said to take daily bike rides for 40 minutes.

He was falsely reported as having died on March 2, 2012, in the 2013 book Obituaries in the Performing Arts, published by McFarland & Company and authored by Harris M. Lentz.

Marion died of a brief illness at the Tucson Medical Center in Tucson, Arizona on December 10, 2020, at the age of 103.

Filmography (selected)

References

Bibliography
 John Holmstrom, The Moving Picture Boy: An International Encyclopaedia from 1895 to 1995, Norwich, Michael Russell, 1996, p. 81.

External links

 
 Don Marion at the American Film Institute

1917 births
2020 deaths
20th-century American male actors
United States Army personnel of World War II
American centenarians
American male film actors
American male silent film actors
Male actors from Hollywood, Los Angeles
Military personnel from California
Male actors from Tucson, Arizona
Men centenarians
United States Army soldiers
University of Arizona alumni
University of Oregon alumni